In the theory of chemical reactivity, the Klopman-Salem equation describes the energetic change that occurs when two species approach each other in the course of a reaction and begin to interact, as their associated molecular orbitals begin to overlap with each other and atoms bearing partial charges begin to experience attractive or repulsive electrostatic forces.  First described independently by Gilles Klopman and Lionel Salem in 1968, this relationship provides a mathematical basis for the key assumptions of frontier molecular orbital theory (i.e., theory of HOMO-LUMO interactions) and hard soft acid base (HSAB) theory.  Conceptually, it highlights the importance of considering both electrostatic interactions and orbital interactions (and weighing the relative significance of each) when rationalizing the selectivity or reactivity of a chemical process.

Formulation and interpretation 
The second term describes the Coulombic attraction or repulsion between the atoms of the reactants (ionic contribution, electrostatic effects). Finally, the third term accounts for all possible interactions between the occupied and unoccupied molecular orbitals of the reactants (two-electron filled-unfilled interactions, stereoelectronic effects). Although conceptually useful, the Klopman-Salem equation seldom serves as the basis for energetic analysis in modern quantum chemical calculations.

Because of the difference in MO energies appearing in the denominator of the third term, energetically close orbitals make the biggest contribution.  Hence, approximately speaking, analysis can often be simplified by considering only the highest occupied and lowest unoccupied molecular orbitals of the reactants (the HOMO-LUMO interaction in frontier molecular orbital theory).  The relative contributions of the second (ionic) and third (covalent) terms play an important role in justifying hard soft acid base theory (HSAB), with hard-hard interactions governed by the ionic term and soft-soft interactions governed by the covalent term.

References 

Quantum chemistry
Organic chemistry